Gilles Dupray (born 2 January 1970 in Lannion) is a retired French athlete who specialised in the hammer throw. He represented his country at the 1996 and 2000 Summer Olympics as well as two World Championships without qualifying for the final. In addition he won the gold medal at the 1994 Jeux de la Francophonie.

His personal best in the event is 82.38 metres set in Chelles in 2000. This is the still standing national record.

Competition record

References

1970 births
Living people
People from Lannion
French male hammer throwers
Athletes (track and field) at the 1996 Summer Olympics
Athletes (track and field) at the 2000 Summer Olympics
Olympic athletes of France
Sportspeople from Côtes-d'Armor